Britta (also spelled Brita) is a female given name that is a variant of the Swedish name Birgitta, which is a form of the Irish Gaelic name Brighid (Bridget in English). The name Britta became popular in Scandinavia and Germany because of St. Bridget of Sweden.

People named Britta
 Britta Böhler, German-born Dutch politician
 Britta Ernst (born 1961), German politician
 Brita Granström, Swedish painter and illustrator
 Britta Gröndahl, Swedish writer, translator, and anarchist
 Brita Hagberg, Swedish soldier
 Britta Heidemann, German épée fencer
 Britta Holmberg, Swedish actress
 Brita Horn, Swedish letter writer and courtier
 Brita Laurelia (1712–1784) was a Swedish publicist, book printer, and poet
 Britta Lejon, Swedish politician
 Brita Catharina Lidbeck, Swedish singer
 Britta Martin, German-born New Zealand triathlete
 Britta Nestler (born 1972), German materials scientist
 Britta Johansson Norgren, Swedish cross-country skier
 Britta Persson, Swedish singer/songwriter
 Britta Phillips, American musician and actress
 Britta Rådström, Swedish politician
 Britta Schwarz, German contralto
 Britta Seeger, German business executive
 Britta Soll, Estonian actress
 Britta Steffen, German swimmer
 Brita Tott, Danish and Swedish landowner, spy, and forger
 Brita Zippel, Swedish alleged witch
 Maura and Britta, 4th-century Christian martyrs

Fictional characters
 Britta Perry, fictional character in the television series Community
 Britta McMann, fictional character in the television series Go Girls
 Britta, fictional character in the novel The Drifters
 The Groovy Girls doll line, by Manhattan Toy, features a doll named Britta.
Princess Academy, by Shannon Hale, features a girl named Britta.

See also 
 1219 Britta, asteroid named in 1932
 Brita, German company that specializes in water filtration products
 Brittas (disambiguation), place name and surname
 Dean and Britta, American indie pop duo featuring Britta Phillips

References 

 
 

German feminine given names
Swedish feminine given names
Scandinavian feminine given names